Landing Beaches; Aslito/Isely Field & Marpi Point, Saipan Island is a National Historic Landmark District consisting of several discontiguous areas of the island of Saipan in the Northern Mariana Islands.  The sites were designated for their association with the Japanese defense of Saipan during World War II, the 1944 Battle of Saipan in which United States forces captured the island, and the subsequent campaigns which used Saipan as a base. The district includes the landing beaches where the U.S. forces landed, the remnants of Japanese airfields Aslito and Marpi Point and Isely Field, the airfield built over much of Aslito from which B-29 bombers were used to bomb the Japanese home islands. Included in the Marpi Point area are Suicide Cliff and Banzai Cliff, two locations where significant numbers of Japanese military and civilians jumped to their deaths rather than surrender to advancing U.S. forces. The loss of Saipan was a major blow to the Japanese war effort, leading to the resignation of Prime Minister Hideki Tojo,  The landmark designation was made in 1985.

Landing beaches

The main beaches where U.S. forces landed during the Battle of Saipan are on the west side of the island, extending from a point south of Garapan southward around Agingan Point and onto Obyan Beach. The landmarked area includes the beaches themselves and the lagoons out to the fringing coral reef. This area includes a small number of remnant Japanese defenses, including several pillboxes, a partially-constructed gun emplacement, and a small Japanese tank that has been set on a pillbox as a sort of monument.

Aslito/Isely Field

The Japanese built Aslito Airfield, now the site of Saipan International Airport, in 1934. It was captured early in the Battle of Saipan; a significant number of its concrete structures survived the battle and the later development of Isely Field and the present airport. Most of these structures are abandoned; the best-preserved is the former air operations building, which was rehabilitated and used as a tourist bureau.

The main elements of Isely Field to survive in the post-war period are its runways, one of which is now used by the modern airport. Elements of the aprons and taxiways used by the B-29s survive to some degree, but are overgrown. Included in this area is a portion of Obyan Beach where a Japanese pillbox is located.

Marpi Point

Marpi Point is the northernmost part of the island.  At the north-facing Suicide Cliff, an unknown but large number of civilians and soldiers jumped to their deaths rather than surrendering to the advancing U.S. forces. The area is now marked by memorials at the top and base of the cliff. Nearby is a Japanese cave fortification known locally as the "last command post".  Below this is a plain where the Japanese had built a small airfield, and the U.S. later built Marpi Point Field, of which only remnants survive. At the very northernmost point of the island is Banzai Cliff, where more people jumped to their deaths. There is also Unai Lagua Japanese Defense Pillbox whose position commands most of the island's north coast.

See also
List of United States National Historic Landmarks in United States commonwealths and territories, associated states, and foreign states
National Register of Historic Places listings in the Northern Mariana Islands
Naval Advance Base Saipan

References

Historic districts in the Northern Mariana Islands
National Historic Landmarks in the Northern Mariana Islands
United States Marine Corps in World War II
Buildings and structures on the National Register of Historic Places in the Northern Mariana Islands
World War II on the National Register of Historic Places in the Northern Mariana Islands
Saipan